Criorhina spinitarsis is a species of hoverfly in the family Syrphidae.

Distribution
India.

References

Eristalinae
Diptera of Asia
Insects described in 1929
Taxa named by Charles Howard Curran